Terrible Things is the debut album by alternative rock supergroup Terrible Things. The lineup during the recording consisted of former Taking Back Sunday guitarist and The Color Fred lead vocalist Fred Mascherino, guitarist and vocalist Andy Jackson from Hot Rod Circuit, and drummer Josh Eppard from Coheed and Cambria fame.

Composition
"Lullaby" was originally a song by Mascherino's former group Breaking Pangaea, and "Terrible Things" was originally a song by The Color Fred, Mascherino's solo project. Originally called "Initials" the band later changed their name to "Terrible Things" as well as the album title, in addition to the song name. Lynam frontman Jacob Bunton has recorded the bass and piano on the album as the band didn't have a permanent bassist at the time.

Release
On April 26, 2010, "Revolution" was made available for streaming through the group's Myspace account. The track was later released as a single on May 25. On July 15, Terrible Things was announced for release in the following month. As part of this announcement, two songs were made available for streaming: "Wrap Me Up" through AbsolutePunk and "Lullaby" through Alternative Press. In July and August, the group performed a handful of dates on the Warped Tour. Terrible Things was released on August 31 through major label Universal Motown Records. The artwork features Mascherino's two children having a tea party with a dollhouse on fire behind them. He said it was representative of the arson incidents in Coatesville. In October and November, the group went on a US tour with Mae and Windsor Drive. On November 19, a music video released for "Revolution", directed by David Brodsky. In late September and early October 2011, the band toured Australia as part of the Soundwave Counter-Revolution festival.

Track listing
All tracks written by Fred Mascherino and Andy Jackson, except where noted.

Personnel
Fred Mascherino – vocals, guitars
Andy Jackson – guitars, vocals
Josh Eppard – drums, percussion, backing vocals
Jason Elgin – producer

Additional musicians
Jacob Bunton – bass guitar, piano, organ
Bethany Borg-Martin – violin
Avi Friedlander – cello
Adam Wright – strings arrangement
Elena Mascherino – vocals on outro

References

External links
Official Website
Myspace Profile

2010 debut albums
Universal Motown Records albums